Thekla Roth is a British model, television personality and actress born in Lancaster, England.  Her early work was predominantly modelling; this included magazines such as FHM, Maxim, Ice, People and more recent work includes TV and film such as Brit Hits - Celebrity Stars at Work, Clubbing to Death, Clever V Stupid.

Early modeling career 
Thekla studied Exercise & Fitness, Sports Therapy before her first film work: a stunt role for the film Coyote Ugly.  Splitting her time between Los Angeles and London her early modeling work included the music videos Sonique Feels So Good and Benny Benassi Satisfaction.  Thekla has modeled for magazines such as FHM, Maxim, Ice, Nuts, Arena, People, Bizarre and Love It.

Live events and multimedia 
Thekla has hosted live events such as Miss Earth, Max Power Live and Xbox Live.  International technology shows include Brainstorm and DigiWarp (Netherlands).  This work lead her to be approached by Ubisoft who went on to create a virtual character based on her in their 2005 video game 187 Ride or Die on the back of which she made numerous personal appearances and international magazine covers.  Thekla also posed for Playboy and was a UK Playboy Cyber Girl.

Television, film and accolades 
Thekla Roth filmed for the 2007 film remake of Baywatch (unreleased), and Isabella in Dave Courtney film Clubbing to Death 2007.  Television work included Red TV's Brit Hits, British reality TV show Celebrity Stars at Work (2007/2008) that documented Thekla's working life by having a camera crew follow her work on a day-to-day basis.  Thekla appeared on BBC Three Clever V Stupid (2009).  Awards include Miss Hot Import Nights 2005 and Supermodel of the Year 2007.

External links 
 Playboy Cyber Girl Thekla Roth
 Coyote Ugly - Cast and Credits
 Miss Hot Import Nights/187 Ride or Die
 Ubisoft 187 Ride or Die
 Clubbing to Death Film
 
 BBC Three - Clever V Stupid

References 

Living people
English television actresses
English female models
People from Lancaster, Lancashire
Year of birth missing (living people)
Actresses from London
Actresses from Los Angeles
Models from London
21st-century American women